Héctor Zatarain (born 27 June 1929) was a Mexican equestrian. He competed in two events at the 1964 Summer Olympics.

References

External links

1929 births
Possibly living people
Mexican male equestrians
Olympic equestrians of Mexico
Equestrians at the 1964 Summer Olympics
Pan American Games medalists in equestrian
Pan American Games gold medalists for Mexico
Equestrians at the 1955 Pan American Games
Medalists at the 1955 Pan American Games